Tony Ferris was an association football player who represented New Zealand at international level.

Ferris made his full All Whites debut in a 2–0 win over Saudi Arabia on 21 June 1988 and ended his international playing career with 13 A-international caps to his credit, his final cap an appearance in a 0–2 loss to England on 8 June 1991.

References 

Living people
New Zealand association footballers
New Zealand international footballers
1961 births
Association football midfielders